Hasus TSU F.C., or National Taiwan University of Sport Football Team, is a university-made football club based in Taichung, Taiwan, attached to National Taiwan University of Sport. They played at the highest level of national football, Taiwan Football Premier League.

Continental record 

AFC President's Cup
2010:  4th in Group stage

References

External links 

Football clubs in Taiwan
University and college football clubs in Taiwan